Amir Hayat (born 28 August 1982) is a Pakistani-born cricketer who played for the United Arab Emirates national cricket team. He made his first-class debut for the United Arab Emirates against Afghanistan in the 2015–17 ICC Intercontinental Cup on 29 November 2017. He made his List A debut for the United Arab Emirates against Nepal in the 2015–17 ICC World Cricket League Championship on 6 December 2017.

In January 2018, he was named in the United Arab Emirates One Day International (ODI) squad for the tri-series against Ireland and Scotland. He made his ODI debut for the United Arab Emirates against Scotland on 23 January 2018. Later the same month, he was named in the United Arab Emirates' squad for the 2018 ICC World Cricket League Division Two tournament.

In August 2018, he was named in the United Arab Emirates' squad for the 2018 Asia Cup Qualifier tournament.

He made his Twenty20 International (T20I) debut for the UAE in a one-off match against Australia on 22 October 2018. In December 2018, he was named in the United Arab Emirates' team for the 2018 ACC Emerging Teams Asia Cup.

In September 2020, Hayat was charged under the International Cricket Council's (ICC) anti-corruption rules, and was suspended from cricket with immediate effect. In July 2021, the ICC banned him from all cricket for eight years, backdated to 13 September 2020.

References

External links
 

1982 births
Living people
Emirati cricketers
United Arab Emirates One Day International cricketers
United Arab Emirates Twenty20 International cricketers
Cricketers from Lahore
Cricketers banned for corruption
Pakistani emigrants to the United Arab Emirates
Pakistani expatriate sportspeople in the United Arab Emirates